Brzuska   is a village in the administrative district of Gmina Bircza, within Przemyśl County, Subcarpathian Voivodeship, in south-eastern Poland.

The inhabitants were mostly originally Rusyns, who then became Ukrainian. There were also some Poles (80) and Jews (50) who lived in the village.  

The main land owner was a Jewish family, surname Ringel, who was taken away by the Russians during or after the war.  

Originally, a Greek Catholic church once stood on the hill - Saint Nicholas the Miracle Worker, which was destroyed.  There was also a masonry church called Transfiguration of Our Lord. It was erected in 1868, renovated in 1920.  It was also destroyed.

During the 1944–1947 expulsion of the Ukrainian inhabitants, approximately 250 were killed, including Rev. Oleksa Bilyk (1892–1944) and his family.  It is reported the killings were a revenge attack for the massacre of Poles in Volhynia.  After the expulsion, it is reported the UPA burned the village so they could not be inhabited by the Polish population.

A Ukrainian cemetery still exists on the hill in the village, but the access road has been removed and it can only be reached by foot.  Rev. Oleksa Bilyk's grave is there and is still tended to.  A local Ukrainian lady, who still lives in the village, sold a cow to pay for a headstone.

See also

 Historiography of the Volyn tragedy
 Operation Vistula

References

External links 
 Carpatho-Rusyn Knowledge Base

Villages in Przemyśl County